Victoria Canal Tinius, also known as Victoria Canal (born August 11, 1998) is a German-born Spanish-American singer-songwriter.

Early life and education

Canal was born in Munich to Gwen Tinius, an architect and artist, and Francisco Canal, a businessman. She was raised a third culture kid, living in Shanghai, Tokyo, Barcelona, Madrid, Dubai, and Amsterdam. Her ethnicity is Cuban and American descent, but refers to herself as Spanish-American because Spain is where she was raised most of her life. At a very young age, her grandmother, a piano teacher, introduced her to music. She started taking classical lessons at 6 years old for both piano and voice. When she turned 11, she discovered songwriting after listening to writers like John Mayer and Gavin DeGraw and decided she wanted to be a singer-songwriter when she grew up. She participated in local and school competitions wherever she could and started booking her own gigs. Her reputation at school was "that singer girl who spends all her time practicing between classes", up to the point that when Victoria moved from Dubai to Barcelona in 2013 (she was about to start 10th grade), she decided to do online school instead to be able to pursue music more professionally. Her inspiration comes from unfamiliar instruments that she doesn't play as well as she does piano, like the bass, loop station, harmonica, etc.

Canal was born without her right forearm due to amniotic band syndrome.

Music career
When she was 13 and lived in Dubai, Canal recorded her first original demo CD at JR Studios. She searched out interview opportunities in Dubai and got several placements on MBC, Dubai One, and others. Also at age 13, Victoria was granted a full-tuition scholarship to Berklee College of Music's summer performance program. At age 14, Victoria moved to Barcelona and studied at Jazz Conservatory en el Aula del Conservatori in Barcelona, Spain. She also returned again to Berklee with a second full-tuition scholarship. After studying at the conservatory for a year and receiving her certificate, Victoria began traveling back and forth from Madrid to Atlanta in fall of 2014 to begin training with renowned vocal coach, "Mama Jan" Smith. As their involvement moved forward, Victoria and her mother Gwen relocated to Atlanta in April 2015 so Victoria could go on her first tour and record her debut EP, Into the Pull.

Canal recorded her debut EP Into the Pull with Justin Bieber and Usher’s vocal coach, "Mama" Jan Smith, Jesse Owen Astin, and Demond Mickens. It was independently released on January 29, 2016.

Acting career 
Canal made her acting debut in December 2022 playing the leading role of 'Ciela' in Episode 8 of Season 2 on Little America on Apple TV+ The show is written by Lee Eisenberg, Kumail Nanjiani, and Emily V. Gordon.

Tours
Canal has supported Emily King, JP Saxe, Tall Heights, Leslie Odom Jr., Teddy Swims and Michael Franti.

In 2022, Canal went on her debut headline tour in support of her EP Elegy including stops in Los Angeles, New York, London and Amsterdam.

Discography

EPs

As Featured Artist 
References

Further reading
 
 

1998 births
Living people
American women singer-songwriters
Singers from Madrid
21st-century American singers
21st-century American women singers
21st-century Spanish singers